Wednesday 04:45 is a Greek crime drama film written and directed by Alexis Alexiou. The film had entered both Karlovy Vary International Film Festival and Tribeca Film Festival.

Cast
Stelios Mainas as Stelios
Dimitris Tzoumakis as Vassos
Adam Bousdoukos as the driver
Giorgos Symeonidis as Omer
Maria Nafpliotou as Sofia, Stelios' wife
Mimi Brănescu as The Romanian

Release
The film was released on 12 March 2015 in Greece. It was also released in United States, South Korea, Czech Republic, Belgium, Israel, UK, Slovakia, Italy and Germany.

Reception

Accolades

The film was nominated for 12 Hellenic Film Academy Awards, winning 9, including Best Film.

External links
 Tetarti 4:45 on IMDb
Tetarti 4:45  on Box office Mojo

Greek crime drama films
Films shot in Athens